Panarairai Island is an island of Papua New Guinea. It is in the Jomard Islands within the Louisiade Archipelago.

References

Islands of Papua New Guinea